This is a list of Sheriffs of Norfolk and Suffolk. The Sheriff (since 1974 called High Sheriff) is the oldest secular office under the Crown and is appointed annually by the Crown. He was originally the principal law enforcement officer in the county and presided at the Assizes and other important county meetings. After 1576 there was a separate Sheriff of Norfolk and Sheriff of Suffolk.

List of Sheriffs of Norfolk and Suffolk

11th century
Toli (died 1066)
Norman
1070–c. 1080 William Malet (died 1071) and Robert Malet
Before 1086 Robert Blund

12th century

13th century

14th century

15th century

16th century

Notes

References
  The history of the worthies of England, Volume 2 By Thomas Fuller
 

History of Norfolk
History of Suffolk
Norfolk
Norfolk-related lists
Suffolk-related lists